Jacques van Zyl (born 13 February 1996) is a South African rugby union player for the  in the Currie Cup. His regular position is hooker.

Van Zyl was named in the  side for the 2022 Currie Cup Premier Division.

References

South African rugby union players
Living people
Rugby union hookers
Western Province (rugby union) players
1996 births